Phenylobacterium kunshanense is a Gram negative, aerobic and motile bacterium from the genus of Phenylobacterium which has been isolated from sludge from a factory for pesticide from Kunshan in China.

References

Caulobacterales
Bacteria described in 2015